SS Anne Hutchinson (MC hull number 238) was a Liberty ship built by the Oregon Shipbuilding Company of Portland, Oregon, and launched on 31 May 1942 The ship was named after the Anne Hutchinson, a 1600 Massachusetts Bay Colony Puritan.

The ship was operated by the Sudden and Christenson Steamship Company of San Francisco, under contract from the War Shipping Administration (WSA) during World War II. On 26 October 1942, she was torpedoed and sunk by submarine U-504 off South Africa, in the Indian Ocean at position .

Sinking
SS Anne Hutchinson was traveling unescorted from Aden, Yemen, to Cape Town, South Africa. She had passed through the Suez Channel and was 59 miles off East London Harbour on 26 October 1942 when German submarine U-504 torpedoed her at about 7:00pm. U-504 commanded by Hans-Georg Friedrich Poske, fired a group of torpedoes. Anne Hutchinson lookouts saw one torpedo and it passed ahead of the ship. There was no time to avoid the other torpedoes. Two torpedoes hit near the engine room and the cargo hold number 4. The explosion blew the cargo hold number 4 hatch covers off and killed three men sitting on it. The explosion created a 16-foot (5 meter) hole in the side of the ship, that broke the propeller shaft and stopped all the ship's power. The bulkheads of cargo hold number 4 stopped the flooding of the ship and she remained afloat. Some of her cargo of 8,000 gallons of oil leak out. All the crew and United States Navy Armed Guards loaded into four lifeboats. The lifeboats rigged the sails to sail to South Africa. One lifeboat lost the group and was separated, but the crew of 10 was rescued by the merchant ship, the SS Steel Mariner and were taken to Durban, South Africa, arriving on 28 October, have only been in the lifeboat for six hours. The other three lifeboats were spotted by a fishing boat near Port Alfred and rescued on 27 October. After resting at Port Alfred the 44 men traveled to Port Elizabeth.

On 29 October, the HMSAS David Haigh (T 13), a South African navy armed trawler and a harbour tug tried to tow the Anne Hutchinson. Due to her partial flooding, the ships were not able to move her. With no other ships available to help, explosives were set to break the Anne Hutchinson in two. The forward section was towed to Algoa Bay, making port on 1 November. The explosives sank the aft section of the ship. The forward section was scrapped as it was a total loss. The David Haigh crew was able to retrieve confidential papers from the Anne Hutchinson that Captain John Stenlund should have removed before abandoning ship.

References

Liberty ships
1942 ships
Ships built in Portland, Oregon
Maritime incidents in October 1942
Ships sunk by German submarines in World War II
World War II shipwrecks in the Indian Ocean